Marguerite Derrida (née Aucouturier; 7 July 1932 – 21 March 2020) was a Czech-born French psychoanalyst. She translated many psychoanalytic works into French.

Biography
Aucouturier trained as a psychologist at the Paris Psychoanalytic Society, and translated many works by Melanie Klein. She trained in anthropology with André Leroi-Gourhan in the 1960s.

Personal life
Aucutourier was born in Prague on 7 July 1932 to Gustave Aucouturier, a French journalist, and Marie Alferi, a Czech. She married Jacques Derrida on 9 June 1957 in Cambridge, Massachusetts. One of their sons is writer Pierre Alféri. She appeared in two documentary films where she talks about life with her husband in Ris-Orangis.

Marguerite Derrida died in Paris on Saturday 21 March 2020 from a COVID-19 infection.

Translations into French by Marguerite Aucouturier 
 Melanie Klein :
 Essais de psychanalyse. 1921–1945, Payot, 1984.
 Deuil et dépression, Payot et Rivages, 2004
 Psychanalyse d'enfants, Payot et Rivages, 2005
 Le complexe d'Œdipe, Payot et Rivages, 2006
 Sur l'enfant, Payot et Rivages, 2012
 Iouri Ianovski, Les Cavaliers, Paris, Éditions Gallimard, trans. in collaboration with P. Zankiévitch and Elyane Jacquet, reviewed and presented by Louis Aragon, 1957 
 Roman Jakobson, La génération qui a gaspillé ses poètes, Paris, Allia, 2001.
 Maxim Gorki, Vie de Klim Samguine, 1961
 Vladimir Propp, Morphologie du conte

Bibliography 
 
 Benoît Peeters, Trois ans avec Derrida. Les carnets d'un biographe, Paris, Flammarion, 2010, 248 pp.
 David Mikics, Who Was Jacques Derrida? An Intellectual Biography, 2009, New Haven, Yale University Press, 288 pp.,

References 

Russian–French translators
1932 births
2020 deaths
Deaths from the COVID-19 pandemic in France
French psychoanalysts
People from Prague in health professions
Czechoslovak emigrants to France